Winchmore School is an 11–18 mixed, community secondary school and sixth form in Winchmore Hill, Greater London, England. It was established in 1956 as a secondary modern school and has been a specialist arts college since 2004.

History 
Winchmore council school was established in 1914 in Highfield Road for infants and juniors. In 1932, a secondary department was added, which became a secondary modern school after reorganisation following the Education Act 1944. In 1956, the seniors moved to the newly established Winchmore School on the opposite side of Highfield Road. It was converted to a comprehensive school in 1967. In 2001, it was identified by Ofsted as achieving better results than other schools with its students who were of Black-Caribbean origin, who made up 13 per cent of the students at that time.

Buildings 
The school is made up of three main buildings, two three-floor buildings and one two-floor building. After 1956, the school continued to make use of prefabricated building on the primary school site for many years. It was initially called Winchmore Secondary Modern and its headmaster was Mr Shepherd. Later the school changed its name to Winchmore School. The school also has four music rooms all of which have an electronic keyboard on each table.

Jackson family 
In 2009 Tito Jackson visited the school and spoke to a group of students. Following this, Katherine Jackson gave a trophy to the school, which the headteacher awarded to a pupil who had "made a great contribution in every sphere of expressive arts".

Notable alumni

 Brian Bennett, drummer, pianist, composer and producer of popular music (when the school was Winchmore Council School)
 Marcus Edwards, footballer
 JME, Grime Artist
 Linda Lusardi, actress, television presenter and former glamour model
 Gregory Motton, playwright and author (when the school was Winchmore Comprehensive)
 Skepta, MC, rapper, songwriter and record producer
 Kazaiah Sterling, footballer

References 

Winchmore Hill
Community schools in the London Borough of Enfield
Secondary schools in the London Borough of Enfield
Educational institutions established in 1956
1956 establishments in England
Specialist arts colleges in England